Kathleen Graber is an American poet and professor of creative writing and poetry at Virginia Commonwealth University. She has also taught at New York University.

Early life and education 
Graber was raised in Wildwood, New Jersey where she still owns a home. She studied under poet Stephen Dunn and went on to earn her BA in philosophy from New York University. She quit teaching middle school English to afford herself the ability to enroll in an MFA program and pursue a career in poetry. Kathleen said of the experience, "Most poets live humble lives, I think, and maybe that is by temperament or design, or maybe it is just a necessity."

Awards 
Graber has earned many awards for her work including the Rona Jaffe Foundation Writers' Award (2003), the Amy Lowell Traveling award, a National Endowment for the Arts award and the Guggenheim award. She is a Hodder Fellow of Princeton University, a National Book Award finalist and a National Book Critics Circle finalist.

2020 UNT Rilke Prize.

Works 
 Correspondence Ardmore, PA: Saturnalia Books, 2005 
 The Eternal City: poems Princeton, NJ: Princeton University Press, 2010 
 The River Twice Princeton, NJ: Princeton University Press, 2019

References

Living people
American women poets
Virginia Commonwealth University faculty
New York University alumni
New York University faculty
21st-century American poets
21st-century American women writers
People from Wildwood, New Jersey
Poets from New Jersey
1959 births
American women academics
The New Yorker people